Endeavour (210) is the fourth ship of the Endurance-class landing platform dock of the Republic of Singapore Navy.

Development 
The navy's intention to purchase the Endurance-class was revealed by former Defence Minister Dr. Tony Tan during his visit to Tuas Naval Base on 3 August 1996. These ships were to replace the five ex-United States Navy (USN) County-class LSTs, which were acquired by Singapore from the United States in the 1970s. ST Marine was awarded the government contract to design and build the four ships – a significant milestone for the local defence and shipbuilding industries given the scale and extensiveness of the programme.

Construction and career
She was laid down in 1998 and launched on 12 February 2000. She was commissioned on 7 April 2001 with the hull number 210.

Two additional SAF task groups have been deployed to the Gulf of Aden; RSS Endurance from June to October 2010 and Endeavour from August 2011.

Gallery

References

External links

Endurance-class landing platform docks
Ships built in Singapore
2000 ships